"Big" Brian Subich is a competitive eater who has participated in the Nathan's Hot Dog Eating Contest and the Alka-Seltzer US Open of Competitive Eating.

Personal
He is originally from Johnstown, Pennsylvania.

References

Living people
American competitive eaters
Sportspeople from Johnstown, Pennsylvania
Year of birth missing (living people)